Solitary is an upcoming American drama film, written, directed, and produced by Nate Parker. It stars David Oyelowo,  Olivia Washington, Barry Pepper and Jimmie Fails.

Cast
 David Oyelowo as Chris Newborn
 Olivia Washington as Tara Benton
 Barry Pepper as Hersh
 Jimmie Fails as Keith Newborn
 Aiden Stoxx as Jake Benton

Production
In May 2020, it was announced David Oyelowo had joined the cast of the film, with Nate Parker directing and writing the film, and Bron Studios set to finance and produce the film. In September 2020, Olivia Washington, Barry Pepper, and Jimmie Fails joined the cast of the film.

Principal photography began in September 2020.

References

Further reading

External links
 

Upcoming films
American drama films
Bron Studios films
2020s English-language films